E. W. Clark may refer to:

Edward Walter Clark (1858–1946), commodore of the Philadelphia Corinthian Yacht Club and senior partner in E. W. Clark & Co.
Enoch White Clark (1802–1856), founder of E.W. Clark & Co.
Edwin W. Clark (1830-?), American Baptist missionary to Nagaland

Clark, E. W.